Phillip Elliott Parotti (born May 18, 1941) is an American fiction writer and educator.

Parotti was born in Silver City, New Mexico, the son of Abramo Angelo Parotti, a college professor, and Jerry Ann (née Elliott), a pianist. He married Shirley Brewer in 1964. A former U.S. naval officer, Dr. Parotti was a literature professor at Sam Houston State University in Huntsville, Texas, from 1972 until his retirement in 2004, and was the fiction editor of Texas Review from 1976-1984. Besides his novels, he has had short fiction published in a number of periodicals. His three mytho-historical novels, The Greek Generals Talk, The Trojan Generals Talk, and Fires in the Sky, all relate to the Trojan War, and have all been critically well received.

Selected bibliography
The Greek Generals Talk: Memoirs of the Trojan War (1986). Decades after the Trojan War, 12 lesser Greek generals tell their versions of events and comment on the actions of Agamemnon, Achilles, Odysseus and others.
The Trojan Generals Talk: Memoirs of the Greek War (1988). In this deft sequel, 10 less-famous Trojan officers get their chance to tell their stories, and speak freely about Troy's major players, including Hector, Priam, and Polydamas.
Fires in the Sky (1990). This is the story of Dymas, a commoner who rises to high military rank in the years before the Trojan War. Parotti describes Troy as war-weakened and in no condition to withstand the determined Greek siege.

References

Sources 
Literature Resource Centre, Sam Houston State University website.

1941 births
Living people
United States Navy officers
20th-century American novelists
American male novelists
American historical novelists
Cultural depictions of the Trojan War
20th-century American male writers
People from Silver City, New Mexico